The 1982–83 Libyan Premier League was the 16th edition of the competition since its inception in 1963.

Overview
It was contested by 16 teams, and Al Madina Tripoli won the championship.

Group stage

Group A

Group B

Playoff

Semifinal
Al-Ahly (Tripoli) 3-1 ; 1-1 Al-Ahly (Benghazi)
Al-Nasr (Benghazi) 1-1 ; 0-1 Al Madina Tripoli

Final
Al Madina Tripoli 2-1 Al-Ahly (Tripoli)

References
Libya - List of final tables (RSSSF)

Libyan Premier League seasons
1982–83 in Libyan football
Libya